The Disruptive Behavior Disorders Rating Scale (DBDRS) is a 45-question screening measure, completed by either parents or teachers, designed to identify symptoms of attention deficit hyperactivity disorder, oppositional defiant disorder, and conduct disorder in children and adolescents.

This questionnaire was developed by Pelham and colleagues in 1992 and inspired the questionnaire developed in parallel, the SNAP-IV (Swanson, Nolan and Pelham Teacher and Parent Rating Scale). It is available online.

For each question, the respondent is asked to indicate the degree to which a statement describes the child's behavior. Response options include “not at all", "just a little", "pretty much", and "very much". For any question they do not know the answer to, respondents are asked to write "DK" for "don't know". The behavioral rating scale takes 5–10 minutes to complete and is designed for use with children ages 5 and up. The scores of the scale have been shown to be reliable and valid across multiple different study samples.

See also 
Attention deficit hyperactivity disorder
Oppositional defiant disorder

References

Further reading

Swanson, J., Nolan, W., & Pelham, W. E. (1981). The SNAP rating scale for the diagnosis of attention deficit disorder. Paper presented at the meeting of the American Psychological Association.
Swanson, J. M. (1992). School-Based Assessment and Interventions for ADD Students. KC Publications.
Pelham, W., Gnagy, E. M., Greenslade, K. E., & Milich, R (1992). Teacher ratings of DSM-III-R symptoms for the disruptive behavior disorders. Journal of the American Academy of Child and Adolescent Psychiatry, 31(2), 210-218. Doi : 10.1097/00004583-199203000-00006

External links 

Society of Clinical Child and Adolescent Psychology
EffectiveChildTherapy.Org information on rule-breaking, defiance, and acting out
Disruptive Behavior Disorders (DBD) Rating Scale

Screening and assessment tools in child and adolescent psychiatry